Mike Weir (born 1970) is a Canadian golfer.

Mike or Michael Weir may also refer to:

 Mike Weir (politician) (born 1957), Scottish politician
 Mike Weir (American football official), American football official
 Michael Weir (murderer), first man in Britain to have been convicted of the same crime twice
 Michael Weir (footballer) (born 1991), footballer from Jersey
 Michael Scott Weir (1925–2006), British diplomat
 Michael H. Weir Jr. (born 1948), American politician from Maryland

See also
 Mickey Weir (born 1966), Scottish footballer